Acalolepta ternatensis is a species of beetle in the family Cerambycidae. It was described by Stephan von Breuning in 1936. It is found in Moluccas and possibly Java.

References

Acalolepta
Beetles described in 1936